The Piano Concerto No. 2 is a composition for solo piano and string orchestra by the Scottish composer James MacMillan.  The work was commissioned by the New York City Ballet and was first performed at Lincoln Center for the Performing Arts on May 8, 2004, by the pianist Cameron Grant and the New York City Ballet Orchestra under MacMillan.  The original ballet performance was choreographed by Christopher Wheeldon.  The piece is dedicated in memory of the poet Edwin Muir.

Composition

Background
The inception for the Piano Concerto No. 2 began when the English choreographer Christopher Wheeldon first approached MacMillan about expanding one of his compositions—1999's "Cumnock Fair" for string quintet—into a larger work fit for a ballet production.  MacMillan subsequently wrote an adagio and fast finale that became the second and third movements, respectively.  MacMillan described revisiting the piece in the score program notes, writing:{{quote|Cumnock Fair'''s original title was 'Hoodicraw Peden' who was Scotland's seventeenth century talibanesque covenanting 'hero' referred to in Edwin Muir's excoriating poem 'Scotland 1941'. Peden was infamous for the crow's mask he used to wear as he went about his zealotry in Cumnock and elsewhere in south-west Scotland. I decided to revisit the Muir poem for inspiration for the two new movements.}}
Additionally, the movement titles "Shambards" and "Shamnation" are made-up words based on the same poem by Edwin Muir.

Structure
The composition has a duration of roughly 30 minutes and is composed in three movements:
Cumnock Fair
Shambards
Shamnation

Instrumentation
The work is scored for solo piano and a string orchestra comprising first and second violins, violas, cellos, and double basses.

Reception
Stephen Johnson of BBC Music Magazine gave the concerto moderate praise, saying it "has its moments of spellbound celebration, like the strings' imitation of improvised Gallic psalm-singing (one of the loveliest things in all folk music) in the central slow movement".  Andrew Achenbach of Gramophone'' similarly lauded:

See also
List of compositions by James MacMillan

References

Concertos by James MacMillan
2003 compositions
MacMillan 2
Compositions for string orchestra